Yanelis Yuliet Labrada Diaz (born October 8, 1981) is a taekwondo silver medalist from Cuba in the Women's Under 49 kg event at the 2004 Summer Olympics.

Diaz defeated Yaowapa Boorapolchai of Thailand in the quarter-finals and Euda Carias of Guatemala in the semifinals but was defeated in the finals by Chen Shih-hsin of Taiwan to win the silver medal.

Diaz won a silver medal at the 2003 World Taekwondo Championships and a bronze medal at the 2004 World Olympic Qualification Tournament.

References

1981 births
Cuban female taekwondo practitioners
Living people
Olympic taekwondo practitioners of Cuba
Taekwondo practitioners at the 2004 Summer Olympics
Olympic silver medalists for Cuba
Olympic medalists in taekwondo
Medalists at the 2004 Summer Olympics
Pan American Games medalists in taekwondo
Pan American Games gold medalists for Cuba
Universiade medalists in taekwondo
Taekwondo practitioners at the 2003 Pan American Games
Universiade bronze medalists for Cuba
World Taekwondo Championships medalists
Medalists at the 2005 Summer Universiade
Medalists at the 2003 Pan American Games
21st-century Cuban women